John, Duke of Randazzo (1317–1348) was duke of Randazzo, Athens, and Neopatria, Count of Malta and regent of Sicily (1342–1348).

The fourth son of Frederick III of Sicily and Eleanor of Anjou, he was the most powerful nobleman in Sicily during the reigns of his brother Peter and his nephew Louis, during whose minority he was regent.

He kept the peace during regency, though he supported the Catalan party over the local Italian nobility.  Thus he appointed Blasco II de Alagona, a Catalan, as his successor. War broke out upon his death during the Plague.

He married Cesarea, daughter of Peter Count of Castalnasetta and had three recorded children: Frederick I who succeeded him as Duke of Athens and Neopatria; and two daughters Eleanor and Constance.

He died of the Black Plague in 1348 and was buried next to his father and nephew in the cathedral of Catania.

Ancestors

References 

1317 births
1348 deaths
Nobility from Catania
Regents of Sicily
Dukes of Italy
House of Barcelona (Sicily)
14th-century deaths from plague (disease)
Dukes of Athens
Burials at Catania Cathedral
Sons of kings